St. Paul and The Broken Bones is an American eight-piece soul band based in Birmingham, Alabama, United States, that formed in 2012. The band is composed of Paul Janeway (vocals), Browan Lollar (guitar), Jesse Phillips (bass), Kevin Leon (drums), Al Gamble (keys), Allen Branstetter (trumpet), Amari Ansari (saxophone), and Chad Fisher (trombone). They have released four albums and two EPs while touring internationally.

History 
Vocalist Paul Janeway and bassist Jesse Phillips met in the mid-2000s while playing in Birmingham as part of the alternative soul outfit The Secret Dangers. In 2012, Jesse and Paul met back in Ol' Elegante Studios in Birmingham to start a new project. Janeway says of the project with Phillips, "It was going to be our last hurrah" before focusing on other careers, "but then something just clicked and we walked out of there with something." As the two began working around Janeway's voice, they realized they were forming a soul outfit. As the project progressed, the pair brought in Browan Lollar, formerly of The 400 Unit, Andrew Lee, Ben Griner, and Allen Branstetter. Here, they recorded their first EP, Greetings from St. Paul and The Broken Bones before ever playing a live show.

After releasing Greetings from St. Paul and The Broken Bones, the band gained attention from managers and labels alike. In January 2013, they began recording their first full-length album, Half the City, at the Nutthouse Recording Studios Sheffield, Alabama and Fame Studios in Muscle Shoals, Alabama. While recording the album, the band brought in Al Gamble to play keys. Gamble continued to play with St. Paul and The Broken Bones and has been a full-time member since January 2014. Half the City was produced by Ben Tanner of the Alabama Shakes.

In February 2013, St. Paul and The Broken Bones gained the attention of Traci Thomas of Thirty Tigers, who signed on as their manager. Shortly thereafter, they began weekend touring on their Greetings from St. Paul and The Broken Bones EP, waiting for the horn players to graduate college before embarking on more extensive touring.

On February 18, 2014, the LP was released under Single Lock Records, a Florence, Alabama-based record label owned by Ben Tanner, Will Trapp, and John Paul White of The Civil Wars. Immediately, Half the City received critical acclaim from many national journalistic outlets including Paste magazine, Garden and Gun, Southern Living, Rolling Stone, and NPR. In its first week of sales, Half the City reached #62 on the Billboard 200 charts. After major stories by NPR Morning Edition and a national television debut on CBS This Morning: Saturday, St. Paul and The Broken Bones' debut album reached #56 on the Billboard 200. St. Paul and the Broken Bones has also made television appearances on Late Night with David Letterman, The Late Show with Stephen Colbert, Jimmy Kimmel Live, Conan, Later... with Jools Holland, Late Night with Seth Meyers, The Late Late Show with Craig Ferguson, Austin City Limits, and Bluegrass Underground. In addition to their own tour, the band opened for The Rolling Stones' Zip Code Tour in Atlanta, Georgia on June 9, 2015, and in Buffalo, New York on July 11, 2015. The group also made appearances at marquee festivals like Coachella, Bonnaroo, Lollapalooza, Newport Folk, Lockn' Festival, Outside Lands, North Sea Jazz, Rock En Seine, Pinkpop, Hurricane festival, Roskilde, Osheaga, Hyde Park London, and tons more. On top of that, they performed "All I Ever Wonder" live on BBC2 from the Glastonbury Festival on June 25, 2016. Some of the groups more notable events played are Elton John's AIDS Foundation Oscar viewing party in Los Angeles, Philip Glass' Tibet House Benefit in New York, The Equal Justice Initiative's 30th Anniversary celebration, and a Carnegie Hall series curated by Rosanne Cash.

St. Paul and the Broken Bones songs have also featured in movie and TV spots such as  Los Angeles, Grey's Anatomy, Big Little Lies, Suits, Black Lightning, ESPN, Fifty Shades of Grey, Life of the Party, The Gambler, Mob Wives, Stitchers, and Switched at Birth,

In May 2015, trombonist Ben Griner left the group to work on personal projects. Their second album Sea of Noise was released in September 2016.

In 2017, they were nominated for a Daytime Emmy Award for Outstanding Musical Performance.

The band released a single, "Apollo", in June 2018, and announced an album, Young Sick Camellia, released in September.

Paul Janeway was featured on the title cut of Sigala's 2018 album Brighter Days.

Since 2014, the band sold over 355,000 album equivalents across three records.

The band has a star on the wall of historic music venue First Avenue in Minneapolis.

Discography

Albums

Studio albums

Live

Extended plays

Singles

References

External links
 Official Site

American soul musical groups
ATO Records artists
Musical groups established in 2012
Musical groups from Birmingham, Alabama
2012 establishments in Alabama
Thirty Tigers artists